Tore Bertil Gottfrid Keller (4 January 1905 – 15 July 1988) was a Swedish footballer who played as a striker. He was part of the Sweden team that won the bronze medal at the 1924 Summer Olympics.

He played 305 matches for IK Sleipner and scored 152 goals and became the Swedish champion with the club in 1938. Internationally he appeared in the 1934 and 1938 FIFA World Cups. Keller was also a keen bandy, table tennis and bowling player.

Career statistics

International 

 Scores and results list Sweden's goal tally first, score column indicates score after each Keller goal.

Honours 
IK Sleipner

 Allsvenskan: 1937–1938

Sweden

 Summer Olympics bronze: 1924

References

External links

Tore Keller images

1905 births
1988 deaths
Swedish footballers
Sweden international footballers
1934 FIFA World Cup players
1938 FIFA World Cup players
Olympic bronze medalists for Sweden
Olympic footballers of Sweden
Footballers at the 1924 Summer Olympics
Olympic medalists in football
Allsvenskan players
Medalists at the 1924 Summer Olympics
Association football forwards
IK Sleipner players
Swedish bandy players
Swedish male table tennis players
Swedish bowling players
Sportspeople from Norrköping
Footballers from Östergötland County